Claudine Emonet (born 13 February 1962 in Sallanches) is a French former alpine skier who competed in the 1988 Winter Olympics.

External links
 sports-reference.com
 

1962 births
Living people
French female alpine skiers
Olympic alpine skiers of France
Alpine skiers at the 1988 Winter Olympics
Sportspeople from Haute-Savoie
20th-century French women